Jayne Heitmeyer is a Canadian actress appearing in many science fiction and horror movies and TV shows.

Heitmeyer was born in Montreal, Quebec, Canada. She is known for playing Lt. Briony Branca in the second season of Night Man, Jessie Jaworski in the 1990s TV series Sirens and Renee Palmer in Gene Roddenberry's Earth: Final Conflict.

Heitmeyer attended the International School of Geneva, John Abbott College in Ste. Anne de Bellevue, Quebec and McGill University in Montreal.

Filmography

Film

Television

References

External links
 

1960 births
Actresses from Montreal
Anglophone Quebec people
Canadian film actresses
Canadian television actresses
Living people
McGill University alumni